Chrysophyllum amazonicum is a tree in the family Sapotaceae, native to tropical South America.

Description
It has small buttresses. The brown bark is fissured. Fascicles feature up to 25 yellow to green flowers.

Distribution and habitat
Chrysophyllum amazonicum is native to Colombia, Venezuela, Ecuador, Peru and Brazil.

References

amazonicum
Flora of western South America
Flora of Venezuela
Flora of North Brazil
Flora of West-Central Brazil
Plants described in 1990